The First Bloooooming (also titled "The First Blooming", later retitled as "Blooming") is the debut studio album by South Korean girl group Kara, released on March 29, 2007, alongside the lead single "Break It". It is the only album which features original member Kim Sunghee who left in 2008 due to their educational purposes, The album was not a commercial success and went unrecognized by the public.

Background Information
Having debuted under the same company as predecessors, Fin.K.L, many comparisons between the two groups were made, even paralleling each individual Kara member to a Fin.KL member.  Kara showcased a "strong female" and mature image through the R&B style of their debut single "Break It".

Chart performance 
The Gaon Music Chart, which is now known as the Circle Music Chart, was launched in February 2010 as the official chart for South Korea, almost 3 years after Kara debuted. The First Blooming entered at number 11 on the Gaon Album Chart for the third week of 2010 and peaked at number 2 for the week ending January 23, 2010. It spent two non-consecutive weeks in the Top 5 and three non-consecutive weeks in the Top 10 of the chart in 2010.

Track listing

Charts

Weekly charts

References

2007 debut albums
Kara (South Korean group) albums